The Bangladesh Sericulture Development Board is a regulatory board in Bangladesh that is in charge of sericulture and is based in Rajshahi, Bangladesh.

History
The Bangladesh Sericulture Development Board was formed in 1978 through the Presidential Ordinance 1977. It is responsible for the welfare sericulture workers and the promotion of the silk industry. The board owns Mulberry plantations for silk agriculture in Bangladesh. The board is responsible for Bangladesh Sericulture Research and Training Institute and also manages state owned silk factories in Bangladesh.

References

Government agencies of Bangladesh
Sericulture
Organisations based in Rajshahi
Organizations established in 1978
1978 establishments in Bangladesh
Agricultural organisations based in Bangladesh
Regulators of Bangladesh